Cerita Cinta di Teater Idola is a television series aired on NET. In collaboration with i-ma-gin-e Films, AKS, Co., Ltd., and Dentsu Inter Admark. The series also featured the 6th anniversary of JKT48 Theater. This series starred by Novi Herlina, Christian Loho, Masaji Wijayanto, Adhi Sastro, Jessica Veranda, Nadya Arina, and others. The series also involves the members of JKT48 who also joined the acting.

Synopsis 
The figure of a woman named Karin (Novi Herlina) with her work as a junior creative leader in the biggest idol group in Indonesia, JKT48 does not make it difficult. With her subtle, courteous nature, and creative thinking, she always making new colors for the members of JKT48, along with her close friend 10 years, Reva (Jessica Veranda) and Windy (Nadya Arina). The three of them were originally incorporated in a local Japanese group idol, named "3Sakura", until finally 5 years later decided the group had disbanded based on the management decision that overshadowed the local group due to the popularity of national group idol like JKT48, so Karin and 2 friends also split up. 5 years did not meet, he reunited in one place the teen idol achieve dreams.

However, his work was briefly blocked by love. While chasing time to the JKT48 Theater, Karin hurriedly bumped into a JKT48 fan named Robby (Christian Loho), along with 2 colleagues Kevin (Masaji Wijayanto) and Gio (Adhi Sastro). That's where the love journey in the theater begins. Will Karin and Robby make a special relationship?

External links 
 NET. Official Website 

Indonesian television series